Odeya Rushinek (born ), known professionally as Odeya Rush, is an Israeli actress. She is known for her lead roles in The Giver (2014), Goosebumps (2015), The Bachelors (2017), Lady Bird (2017), Dumplin' (2018), and Let It Snow (2019).

Early life 
Odeya Rushinek was born in Haifa, Israel, to a family of Ashkenazi Jewish (Polish-Jewish and Russian-Jewish) descent. Her father Shlomo Rushinek is a Sabra (Israeli-born Jew), whereas her mother Maya Greenfeld was born in Soviet Russia and immigrated to Israel. In Hebrew, her first name means "I will thank God". As an eight-year-old growing up in her hometown of Haifa, Israel, she wrote and performed plays.

Her family moved to the United States when she was nine years old so that her father could take up a job as a security consultant in Alabama. When she arrived, Rush did not know English and could only speak Hebrew. She attended the N. E. Miles Jewish Day School in Birmingham, Alabama, where she resided; she later moved to Midland Park, New Jersey, where she attended public school.

In the beginning of 2013, Rush moved to Los Angeles with her family. She has six brothers; four of them are younger than she is—two sets of twins who reside with their parents in Los Angeles, and two older paternal half-brothers who reside in Israel.

Career

Modelling 

Before becoming an actress, Rush began her career in her childhood and adolescence when she was discovered as a model in the United States, appearing in major campaigns and advertisements for fashion brands Polo Ralph Lauren, Gap, Tommy Hilfiger, and H&M.

She also starred in a summer campaign for a collaboration between FILA and Urban Outfitters in 2018.

Acting 
Her first acting roles began in 2010 in Law & Order: Special Victims Unit, in the episode "Branded", in which she played the character Hannah Milner; and in the television series Curb Your Enthusiasm in the episode "Mister Softee", as Emily.

Her first film role was in 2012, playing Joni Jerome, the best friend of Timothy, in the Peter Hedges-directed Disney film The Odd Life of Timothy Green.

Rush co-starred, as Fiona, in the science fiction film The Giver (2014), based on the 1993 novel of same name from Lois Lowry, and directed by Phillip Noyce. The film also starred Brenton Thwaites, Jeff Bridges, Meryl Streep, Katie Holmes, Alexander Skarsgård and Taylor Swift.

In 2015, Rush played Ashley Burwood, niece of Johana Burwood (played by Sarah Hyland), in the comedy film See You in Valhalla. Rush's next role was the female lead in the film Goosebumps, based on the R. L. Stine's popular book series. Rush played Hannah Fairchild, the "daughter" of R. L. Stine (portrayed by Jack Black), who teams up with her neighbor to fight the Goosebumps monsters.

In 2016, Rush completed filming the satirical comedy film Dear Dictator, in which she starred with Michael Caine and Katie Holmes. She was also cast as Ella Hatto, opposite Sam Worthington, in action-thriller film The Hunter's Prayer directed by Jonathan Mostow.

In 2017, she had a supporting role in Greta Gerwig's Lady Bird; Rush was nominated along with the rest of the cast for numerous awards. The film earned five Academy Award nominations, including Best Picture and starred in The Bachelors with J. K. Simmons in 2017.

In 2021, Rush played the titular role in her first Hebrew-language Israeli drama series Baalat HaChalomot and the following year, she played Macy in the comedy-drama film Cha Cha Real Smooth and River in the supernatural horror film Umma.

Acting credits

Film

Television

Music videos

Accolades

 2013: Rush was named one of Hollywood's 20 up and coming young actresses under 20 to watch by The Midwest TV Guys
 2014: Rush was one of two Israeli actresses, along with Gal Gadot, to be named as Hollywood's newest leading ladies by InStyle magazine

{| class="wikitable plainrowheaders sortable"
|-
! Year
! Nominated work 
! Award / film festival
! Category
! Result
! class="unsortable" | 
|-
| 2012 
| rowspan="2"| 
|| The Chambie Awards || Best Actress ||  || 
|-
| rowspan="2"| 2013
|| Young Artist Awards || Best Performance in a Feature Film – Supporting Young Actress  ||  || 
|-
|We Are What We Are
|| The Chambie Awards || Best Actress ||  || 
|-
| rowspan="2"|2014 ||Herself 
|| Teen Choice Awards || Olay Fresh Effects Breakout Star Award ||  ||  
|-
|
|| The Chambie Awards || Best Actress ||  || 
|-
| 2016 
|Goosebumps
|| Young Artist Awards ||  ||  ||  
|-
| rowspan="8" |2017 
| rowspan="16" |Lady Bird 
|| Detroit Film Critics Society Awards || Best Ensemble ||  || 
|-
| San Diego Film Critics Society Awards || Best Performance by an Ensemble||  || 
|-
| Seattle Film Critics Society Awards || Best Ensemble Cast ||  || <ref>{{cite web|url=http://seattlefilmcritics.com/2017/12/11/blade-runner-2049-leads-the-2017-seattle-film-critics-society-nominations/|title='Blade 'Blade Runner 2049' Leads the 2017 Seattle Film Critics Society Nominations – Seattle Film Critics Society] Runner 2049 Leads the 2017 Seattle Film Critics Society Nominations|work=Seattle Film Critics Society|date=11 December 2017|access-date=13 December 2017}}</ref>
|-
| Online Film Critics Society Awards || Best Ensemble||  || 
|-
| Florida Film Critics Circle Awards || Best Cast ||  || 
|-
| Awards Circuit Community Awards || Best Cast Ensemble ||  || 
|-
|Chicago Indie Critics Awards
|Best Ensemble Cast
|
|
|-
|Georgia Film Critics Association Awards
|Best Ensemble
|
|
|-
| rowspan="7" |2018
| Online Film & Television Association Awards || Best Ensemble ||  || 
|-
|International Cinephile Society Awards
|Best Ensemble
|
|
|-
|International Online Cinema Awards
|Best Ensemble
|
|
|-
|Columbus Film Critics Association Awards
|Best Ensemble
|
|
|-
|| Critics' Choice Awards|| Best Acting Ensemble||  || 
|-
| Screen Actors Guild Awards || Outstanding Performance by a Cast in a Motion Picture ||  || 
|-
| Gold Derby Awards || Ensemble Cast ||  || 
|-
|2019
| CinEuphoria Awards || Best Ensemble – International Competition ||  ||
|}

See also
List of Israelis
List of Jews in the performing arts

Notes

References

External links

 
 
 Interview on Calabasas Courier'' (13 November 2012)

1997 births
Israeli emigrants to the United States
Israeli child actresses
Israeli film actresses
Israeli female models
Israeli television actresses
Jewish Israeli actresses
Living people
Actresses from Birmingham, Alabama
People from Haifa
Actresses from Haifa
People from Midland Park, New Jersey
Israeli people of Polish-Jewish descent
Israeli people of Russian-Jewish descent
Israeli Ashkenazi Jews
Israeli Jews
Israeli expatriate actresses in the United States
21st-century Israeli women